Mahtabi (also Romanized as Mahtābī) is a village in Aramu Rural District, in the Central District of Darreh Shahr County, Ilam Province, Iran. At the 2006 census, its population was 298, in 55 families. The village is populated by Lurs.

References 

Populated places in Darreh Shahr County
Luri settlements in Ilam Province